The Western Australian Government Railways (WAGR) Z class was a class consisting of three lightweight six-wheeled diesel-mechanical locomotives which were active in Western Australia from November 1953 to January 1983 and which have since been preserved.

History
Ordered in 1951 by the WAGR as part of its post-war rehabilitation program, the Z class was ordered from the Drewry Car Company at a cost of £12,000 per locomotive, with their construction being subcontracted to Robert Stephenson and Hawthorn Ltd (RSH) of Newcastle, England. After the locomotives were built they were shipped from Britain to Australia, with Z1151 arriving at Fremantle harbor on 26 September 1953. The remaining two Z class locomotives would arrive around five weeks later, where after they, alongside Z1151, would enter service with the WAGR in November 1953. This was despite the fact that their delivery date had originally being set for September 1952.

After entering service with the WAGR they were assigned to works as shunters on the jetty's and wharfs at Busselton, Bunbury and other ports. They were capable of working for 22 hours per day, operating in three shifts, and alongside this could operate for five days on a single fuel tank.

By January 1954 the Z class were considered to have proven their worth to the WAGR. All three Z class locomotives were withdrawn from service in January 1983 and subsequently were sold into preservation.

Preservation 
After being withdrawn from service by the WAGR in January 1983 all three Z class locomotives were sold into preservation.

The first member of the class, Z1151, would be sold to the Steamtown Peterborough Railway Preservation Society while the third, Z1153, was sold to the Boulder Loopline Railway.

The second member of the class, Z1152, would be sold to the Hotham Valley Railway (HVR) and was used by them on work trains during the rehabilitation of the Dwellingup - Etmilyn section of track throughout 1985-86. In June 2003 a request was made to the HVR by Works Infrastructure (E.D.I) to allow the for the use of Z1152 to assist in the construction of the new Urban Rail Car Depot at Nowergup on the new extension of the Northern Suburbs Railway and was transferred by road to Nowergup which was not connected by rail at time of movement.

After the return of Z1152 to the HVR, the locomotive has seen use as the shunter at Pinjarra depot.

Design 
The Gardner 8LW uses 110 mm × 150 mm cylinders and has a displacement of 11.16 litres while producing it's power in the 600-1700 RPM range.

Furthermore, the class uses a mechanical transmission, with the power being transmitted to the six driving wheels via external coupling rods. The class' braking system uses air for the locomotive and vacuum for the train. The class' maximum speed is 28 km/h (17 mph) and is capable of producing a tractive effort of 38.21 kN when starting.

Class list

Gallery

References

Further reading

External links 

 Photo of Z1151 shunting goods in Perth
 Photo of Z1153 at Esperance

C locomotives
Diesel locomotives of Western Australia
Railway locomotives introduced in 1953
Robert Stephenson and Hawthorns locomotives
3 ft 6 in gauge locomotives of Australia